Karak is a tehsil located in Karak District, Khyber Pakhtunkhwa, Pakistan. The population is 155,642 according to the 2017 census.

See also 
 List of tehsils of Khyber Pakhtunkhwa

References 

Tehsils of Khyber Pakhtunkhwa
Populated places in Karak District